Vasilios Kotronias (first name sometimes spelled Vassilios; born 25 August 1964) is a Greek chess player and writer. He is a ten-time Greek champion (1986, 1987, 1988, 1990, 1991, 1992, 1994, 2006, 2010, 2014). Kotronias was awarded the titles of International Master in 1986 and Grandmaster in 1990 by FIDE.

Between 1998 and 2004, he represented Cyprus, but has since switched federations to become a Greek national player once again.

International tournament record
1st 1988 Athens (Acropolis International)
1st 1993 Komotini
1st 1993 Corfu
1st 1994 Gausdal
1st 1995 Gausdal
1st 1996 Rishon le Zion
1st 1998 Panormo
 1st 2003 Gibraltar Chess Festival (jointly with Nigel Short)
 equal 1st 2003/04 Hastings International Chess Congress
 equal first at 2008 Cappelle-la-Grande Open
 1st 2020 Ikaros Chess Festival

Most played openings

Team events
In team chess, he has participated in many Chess Olympiads since 1984, including eight on top board, with an overall score of +63 −29 = 62 (61%). In seven appearances at the European Team Chess Championships, all played at board one, he made a score of +19 −13 = 26. At León, in 2001, he earned an individual silver medal for his score of 5½/8. He also earned a bronze medal for his performance on the second board at the Dresden Olympiad 2008 and a gold medal for his performance on the reserve board at the European Team Championship 2013 in Warsaw.

Politics 
He was a candidate for the European Parliament with The River, in the elections of 25 May 2014.
After leaving the River, Kotronias joined Syriza and was a candidate in the 2019 general elections. He failed to get elected, as he finished last amongst the 18 candidates of his party.

Notable games
Vasilios Kotronias vs Evgeny Tomashevsky, European Individual Championships (2013), Spanish Game: Morphy Defense. Steinitz Deferred (C79), 1-0
Vasilios Kotronias vs Hikaru NakamuraGibtelecom (2009), Caro-Kann Defense: Classical Variation. Main lines (B18), 1-0
Peter Heine Nielsen vs Vasilios Kotronias, Hastings 2004, King's Indian Defense: Orthodox Variation, Classical System Neo-Classical Line (E98), 0-1
Vasilios Kotronias vs Nikolaos Skalkotas, 34th Greek Teams Championship 2005, Spanish Game: Closed Variations, Chigorin Defense (C99), 1-0
Laurent Fressinet vs Vasilios Kotronias, 12th European Individual Championship (2011), King's Indian Defense: Orthodox Variation. Gligoric-Taimanov System (E92), 0-1

Publications

References

External links

1964 births
Living people
Chess grandmasters
Greek chess players
Greek non-fiction writers
Chess writers
Chess Olympiad competitors
Politicians from Athens
Sportspeople from Athens
Writers from Athens
20th-century Greek people